"Third Day of a Seven Day Binge" is a song by American rock band Marilyn Manson. It was released as the first single from their ninth studio album, The Pale Emperor (2015).

Release and promotion
The song was premiered on BBC Radio 1's Rock Show by Daniel P. Carter on October 26, 2014. Immediately following the broadcast, the song was released for free download on the band's official website, where it was available until November 9. The song was then released as a one-track digital single via music download services on November 10, as the first official single from the album. A limited edition CD was released exclusively at Best Buy stores in the US on December 23, containing both "Third Day of a Seven Day Binge" and the album's other single, "Deep Six", as double A-sides. A limited amount of these CDs came bundled with an exclusive T-Shirt. A 10" vinyl single – containing the acoustic version of the song, "Day 3", on the b-side – was available with pre-orders of the vinyl edition of the album at participating independent record stores.

Manson performed the song with The Smashing Pumpkins at London's KOKO on December 5, 2014. "The real treat comes in the encore," wrote Classic Rock, "when Marilyn Manson saunters onto the stage to perform his new single… before duetting with Corgan on 'Ava Adore' to close the show."

The song was featured in the opening sequence of the Criminal Minds episode entitled "Dust and Bones" (13.7) which premiered on November 15, 2017.

Music video
In an interview with News.com.au on January 22, 2015, Manson confirmed that he completed a music video for the song in early January, but that its release was delayed because he was unhappy with the editing. He also confirmed that he filmed videos for a further two songs from the album. The video for "Third Day of a Seven Day Binge" was released on to the band's YouTube account on July 9, 2015.

Track listing and formats
Digital single
 "Third Day of a Seven Day Binge" - 4:26

Best Buy-exclusive CD single
 "Third Day of a Seven Day Binge" - 4:26
 "Deep Six" - 5:02

10" vinyl single
 "Third Day of a Seven Day Binge" - 4:26
 "Day 3" - 4:11

Credits and personnel
Credits
 Recorded at Abattoir Studios, Studio City, California
 Drums recorded by Gustavo Borner at Igloo Studios, Burbank, California
 Songs of Golgotha (BMI)/Tyler Bates Music, Inc. (BMI), under exclusive license to Cooking Vinyl and Loma Vista Recordings

Personnel
Marilyn Manson – songwriter, lead vocals, producer
Tyler Bates – songwriter, electric guitar, bass guitar, keyboards, programming, producer
Gil Sharone – drums
 Robert Carranza – mixing
 Dylan Eiland – additional programming
 Joanne Higginbottom – Pro Tools editing
 Brian Lucey – mastering
 Wolfgang Matthes – additional programming, mixing

Credits adapted from the liner notes of The Pale Emperor.

Chart performance
Note: In the US, "Third Day of a Seven Day Binge" was released as a double A-side with concurrent single "Deep Six".

Release history

References

2014 songs
2014 singles
Marilyn Manson (band) songs
Songs written by Marilyn Manson
Songs written by Tyler Bates
Cooking Vinyl singles
Loma Vista Recordings singles
Glam rock songs
Post-punk songs